is a Japanese singer and actor who is a member of the idol group Snow Man under Johnny & Associates.

Biography
Ren Meguro joined Johnny & Associates in October 2010. In November 2016, he was chosen to be a member of Uchuu Six, a newly formed pre-debut unit under Johnny's Jr., a branch of Johnny & Associates that manages trainees and their activities.

On January 17, 2019, Meguro was added as a new member to Snow Man, an existing Johnny's Jr. unit, in addition to Koji Mukai and Raul. Snow Man made their official debut on January 22, 2020. Subsequently corresponding to his debut in Snow Man, Meguro withdrew from Uchuu Six.

In 2021, Meguro co-starred with labelmate Shunsuke Michieda in the television live action adaptation of "My Love Mix-Up!" in his first leading role outside of Snow Man related projects.

On February 21, 2022, Meguro was announced to star as one of the four lead roles in "The Waxing and Waning of the Moon," the film adaptation of the 157th Naoki Prize winning novel, "Tsuki no Michikake" (月の満ち欠け) by Shogo Sato, on the film's official Twitter. In April of the same year, he was announced to co-star in the live action film adaptation of "My Happy Marriage" with model Mio Imada to be released the following year.

Filmography

TV dramas

Films

Awards

References

External links
 

Living people
1997 births
Japanese singers